The Costa Rican general election of 1849 was held to elect the President of the State. This was the first presidential election in Costa Rica's history as the Reformed Constitution of 1848 created the title of "President", before that point the equivalent office was called "Head of State".

The Costa Rican election of 1849 took place after the coup against José María Castro Madriz, who was forced to resign. At that time, the vice president, Miguel Mora Porras, held the presidency temporarily and his brother, Juan Rafael Mora Porras, was elected over Rafael Moya Murillo and Manuel Antonio Bonilla Nava.

The Constitution in force in this period restricted the right to vote for men over 21 years old owners of an immovable property equivalent to 300 pesos and an annual income of at least 150 pesos who also knew how to read and write, so that these elections were carried out mostly among the bourgeoisie.

The inhabitants chose 90 Electors who, in the second-grade elections, chose the president. San Jose chose 26, and Guanacaste 12 which voted in block for Mora, while the 17 from Heredia, the 12 from Alajuela and the 2 from Puntarenas did it for Moya. Cartago had 20 electors of which 11 voted for Mora and the remaining 9 who were the only ones who voted for Bonilla.

References

Elections in Costa Rica
1849 elections in Central America
1849 in Costa Rica